Megan Frazer (born 2 October 1990) is an Ireland women's field hockey international. She was a member of the Ireland team that played in the 2018 Women's Hockey World Cup. She has also captained the Ireland team. Frazer was a member of the Maryland Terrapins team that won the  2010 and 2011 NCAA Division I Field Hockey Championships. Between 2010 and 2012 she was named three times as an NFHCA All-American and in 2011 she also won the Honda Sports Award. Frazer has also won Irish Senior Cup titles with Ulster Elks.

Early years, family and education
Frazer is from Derry, Northern Ireland. She is a daughter of Stan/Wilson Frazer and Margaret Frazer. She has a sister, Lauren. She is also a cousin of Darron Gibson, the former Republic of Ireland international footballer. Frazer played for the Northern Ireland women's national football team at youth level. Between 2001 and 2009, Frazer attended Foyle and Londonderry College, where she played field hockey, cricket and touch rugby. Between 2009 and 2013 she attended the University of Maryland, where she gained a BA in Hearing and Speech Sciences. Between 2014 and 2016 she attended Ulster University, where she gained a Master's degree in Biomedical engineering.

Domestic teams

Foyle and Londonderry College
Frazer was captain of the Foyle and Londonderry College team that won the 2009 Ulster Senior Schoolgirls' Cup and finished as runners up in the Kate Russell All-Ireland Schoolgirls Championships. In the Ulster Senior Schoolgirls' Cup final, Frazer scored the only goal as Foyle and Londonderry  defeated Ballymena Academy 1–0.

Ballymoney
In 2007–08 Frazer was a member of the Ballymoney team that finished as runners up to Pegasus in both the Ulster Shield and the Irish Senior Cup. Her teammates included Bridget McKeever and Angela Platt.

Maryland Terrapins
Between 2009 and 2012, while attending the University of Maryland, Frazer played for Maryland Terrapins. She subsequently helped them win the 2010 and  2011 NCAA Division I Field Hockey Championships. Between 2010 and 2012 she was named three times as an NFHCA All-American.  She also won the Honda Sports Award in 2012 as the best field hockey player in the nation.

Holcombe
In 2013–14 Frazer played for Holcombe in the Women's England Hockey League, helping the club gain promotion to the Premier Division. Frazer scored a hat-trick as Holcombe defeated Brooklands Poynton 8–2 in a promotion play-off. Her teammates at Holcombe included Nicola Daly, Steph Elliott, Lucy Wood and Maddie Hinch.

Ulster Elks
In 2014, while attending Ulster University, Frazer began playing for Ulster Elks in the Women's Irish Hockey League. Her teammates at Elks included Shirley McCay and Stephanie Jameson. She subsequently helped Elks win the Irish Senior Cup in both 2014–15  and 2015–16. In 2016 she also captained Elks as they won the EuroHockey Club Champions Challenge I.
After the Elks were relegated from the Women's Irish Hockey League at the end of the 2016–17 season, Frazer continued to play for and coach the team in the Ulster Premier League. She also  began playing for Mannheimer HC in the Bundesliga.

Mannheimer HC
In 2016 Frazer began playing for Mannheimer HC in the Bundesliga. Frazer also played for Mannheimer HC in the 2018 EuroHockey Club Champions Cup.

Ireland international
Frazer represented Ireland at Under-16, Under-18 and Under-21 levels  before making her senior debut against Wales in June 2008. In 2014 she was appointed Ireland captain by Darren Smith. In March 2015 Frazer captained the Ireland team that won a 2014–15 Women's FIH Hockey World League Round 2 tournament hosted in Dublin, defeating Canada in the final after a penalty shoot-out. Frazer also captained the Ireland team that won the 2015 Women's EuroHockey Championship II. She scored in the final as they defeated the Czech Republic 5–0. A knee injury meant Frazer was unavailable for Ireland selection for twenty months. However she returned in time to represent Ireland at the 2018 Women's Hockey World Cup and was a prominent member of the team that won the silver medal. She featured in five of Ireland's six games during the tournament, including the pool games against the United States, India, and England, the quarter-final against India, and the semi-final against Spain. However she missed out on the final against the Netherlands after picking up an injury against Spain.

Honours
Ireland
Women's Hockey World Cup
Runners Up: 2018
Women's FIH Hockey World League
Winners: 2015 Dublin
Women's EuroHockey Championship II
Winners: 2015
Women's Hockey Champions Challenge I
Runners Up: 2014
Ulster Elks
EuroHockey Club Champions Challenge I
Winners: 2016
Irish Senior Cup
Winners: 2014–15, 2015–16
Maryland Terrapins
NCAA Division I Field Hockey Championship
Winners: 2010, 2011
Runners Up: 2009
Ballymoney
Irish Senior Cup
Runners Up: 2007–08
Ulster Shield
Runners Up: 2007–08
Foyle and Londonderry College
Ulster Senior Schoolgirls' Cup
Winners: 2008–09 
Kate Russell All-Ireland Schoolgirls Championships
Runners Up: 2009
Individual
Honda Sports Award
Winner: 2012
NFHCA All-American
Winner: 2010, 2011, 2012

References

1990 births
Living people
Ireland international women's field hockey players
Female field hockey players from Northern Ireland
Irish female field hockey players
British female field hockey players
Irish field hockey coaches
Maryland Terrapins field hockey players
Holcombe Hockey Club players
Mannheimer HC players
Expatriate field hockey players
Expatriate sportspeople from Northern Ireland in Germany
Expatriate sportspeople from Northern Ireland in the United States
Women's Irish Hockey League players
Women's England Hockey League players
Feldhockey Bundesliga (Women's field hockey) players
Female field hockey defenders
Female field hockey midfielders
Women's association footballers from Northern Ireland
Sportspeople from Derry (city)
People educated at Foyle College
University of Maryland, College Park alumni
Alumni of Ulster University
Women's association footballers not categorized by position